The 1982 World Field Archery Championships were held in Kingsclere, England.

Medal summary (Men's individual)

Medal summary (Women's individual)

Medal summary (team events)
No team event held at this championships.

References

E
1982 in British sport
International archery competitions hosted by the United Kingdom
International sports competitions hosted by England
World Field Archery Championships